"Chun-Li" is a song by rapper Nicki Minaj from her fourth studio album, Queen (2018), released on April 12, 2018, by Young Money Entertainment and Cash Money Records as the lead single from the album. It was solely written by Minaj and produced by Jeremy Reid. According to Minaj, Reid's name was added to the writing credits for adlibs and production. Commercially, the song peaked at number 10 on the US Billboard Hot 100, reached the top 20 in Canada, and the top 30 in France and the United Kingdom. The song won the award for Best Hip-Hop Video at the 2018 MTV Video Music Awards.

Background and release 
In March 2017, Minaj released a three-single pack that included "Changed It" with Lil Wayne, "No Frauds" with Drake and Wayne, and "Regret in Your Tears", intended as lead singles for Queen but eventually did not make the final cut. On April 10, 2018, Minaj announced on Instagram that she would be releasing two new songs: "Barbie Tingz" and "Chun-Li" on April 12, and also posted cover artworks of the respective singles. "Chun-Li", which takes its name from the Street Fighter character of the same name, was released alongside the buzz single "Barbie Tingz" as a part of Minaj's upcoming fourth studio album Queen (2018) and made available for streaming and digital download on April 12 by Young Money Entertainment and Cash Money Records. The release of songs landed on the 10th anniversary of Minaj's second mixtape, Sucka Free (2008). On May 30, Minaj posted a video showing the making of the song, in preview of her upcoming documentary about the making of Queen set to air on HBO Max in 2021.

Production

"Chun-Li" was produced by Atlanta-native producer J. Reid for Chevi Muzic, alongside Minaj who was credited as a coproducer. According to him, Minaj wanted to deliver the type of "boom-bap" flavored beats that are reminiscent of New York City hip-hop. The song is sonically built on slapping, percussion, and sparse soundbeads. Minaj linked with Reid in late December 2017, and later explained to him what kind of beat she wanted for the song. She proceeded to rap it and give him the vibe. He made about 13 different beats, and Minaj picked out one. The song was done in early April 2018, including writing, production, mixing and mastering.

Lyrically, Minaj "rails" (criticizes) online detractors and references negative press in the track. "They need rappers like me! So they can get on their fucking keyboards and make me the bad guy, Chun-Li," she declares in the second interlude.

Music videos

A vertical music video for the song was released on April 13, 2018, via Minaj's YouTube channel. It is a video montage of videos filmed by Minaj while holding her phone vertically. In the visual, Minaj recites the lyrics of the song while posing on a couch, but relinquishes control of her phone for a couple of runway-like shots.

On April 27, Minaj released a teaser to promote the official music video. However, she confirmed on her Instagram that the teaser was not related in any way to the music video and is rather a video of her and Aliya Janell, the choreographer of the official video, doing a freestyle dance to the song.

The full accompanying video of the song was released on May 4, with the subtitle 春麗, which translates to Chun-Li. Directed by Steven Klein through Good Company Pictures, it features what Klein deemed Asian futuristic/superhero-inspired outfits. The video won the Best Hip-Hop Video at the 2018 MTV Video Music Awards, and was nominated for Best Hip-Hop at the MTV Europe Music Awards and has over 160 million views on YouTube. Despite this, the video was accused of perpetuating Asian stereotypes and appropriating Asian culture by outlets such as Cosmopolitan and Teen Vogue.

Critical reception
Bianca Gracie of Billboard said "Minaj sounds cocky in the best way […] she resurrects her Nicki the Ninja alter-ego by assassinating the horn-driven beat with her lyrical wordplay, switching accents with ease." Jon Caramanica of The New York Times said, "these are sparring records–loose, pugnacious, a little uncentered […] 'Chun-Li' swaggers with the authority of the mid-90s. As is the norm, Ms. Minaj aims shots at unnamed antagonists, but in the past, that bluster felt truly targetless. But now, for the first time since the beginning of her career, there's someone who might plausibly shoot back, and win." John Kennedy from XXL said the song is "open enough for Nicki [Minaj] to get her bars off à la her mixtape days." Maeve McDermott of USA Today said, "Chun-Li sees Nicki out for blood, with the track named after a Street Fighter character who seeks revenge after her father's murder."

Commercial performance
"Chun-Li" debuted at number 92 on the US Billboard Hot 100 after a day of tracking, with 20,000 downloads sold and 3.5 million streams, and four days of radio airplay. It ascended to number 10 the following week, selling 38,000 copies and earning 22.1 million streams. The song became Minaj's sixth top 10 entry as a lead artist–and her first solo single to enter that region since "Anaconda" in 2014–and 16th overall, extending her record for most top 10 singles among female rappers. "Chun-Li" also logged the greatest jump on the Hot 100, 82 positions, since Katy Perry's "Roar" (2013) jumped 83 spots following a full tracking week. It fell 38 positions to number 48 in its third week. On its fifth week, the song re-entered the top 20 of the chart jumping to number 19. It was certified platinum by the Recording Industry Association of America (RIAA) on July 30, 2018 for 1 million equivalent units moved.

Outside the United States, "Chun-Li" reached the top 20 in Canada, the top 30 in France and the United Kingdom.

Live performances
Minaj first performed "Chun-Li" live during Future’s set at Rolling Loud Festival in Miami on May 13, 2018. She also performed the song during her Saturday Night Live season finale appearance on May 19. She performed a medley of "Chun-Li" and "Rich Sex" on the BET Awards 2018 held on June 23.

Other versions
American rappers Juelz Santana, BlocBoy JB, and Baby Soulja recorded their own freestyles over the song's beat.

Credits and personnel
Credits and personnel adapted from Queen album liner notes.

Recording
 Recorded at Glenwood Place Studios, Burbank, California
 Mastered at Chris Athen Masters, Austin, Texas

Personnel
 Nicki Minaj – vocals, co-production
 J. Reid – production
 Aubry "Big Juice" Delaine – record engineering
 Laura Bates – record engineering assistance
 Lucas Lyle – record engineering assistance
 Iván Jiménez – record engineering assistance
 Chris Athens – mastering

Charts

Weekly charts

Year-end charts

Certifications

Release history

References

2018 singles
2018 songs
Cash Money Records singles
Music videos directed by Steven Klein (artist)
Nicki Minaj songs
Republic Records singles
Songs about comics
Songs about fictional female characters
Songs written by Nicki Minaj
Vertically-oriented music videos
Young Money Entertainment singles
2018 YouTube videos